Piano Concerto No. 1 refers to the first piano concerto published by one of a number of composers:

Piano Concerto No. 1 (Bartók) (Sz. 83), by Béla Bartók
Piano Concerto No. 1 (Beethoven) (Op. 15), by Ludwig van Beethoven
Piano Concerto No. 1 (Brahms) (Op. 15), by Johannes Brahms
Piano Concerto No. 1 (Chopin) (Op. 11), by Frédéric Chopin
Piano Concerto No. 1 (Emerson) (1977), by Keith Emerson
Piano Concerto No. 1 (Ginastera) (Op. 28) by Alberto Ginastera
Piano Concerto No. 1 (Glass) (Tirol Concerto for Piano and Orchestra, 2000), by Philip Glass
Piano Concerto No. 1 (Glazunov) (Op. 92, 1911) by Alexander Glazunov
Piano Concerto No. 1 (Kabalevsky) (Op. 9), by Dmitry Kabalevsky
Piano Concerto No. 1 (Lehnhoff) (2005), by Dieter Lehnhoff
Piano Concerto No. 1 (Lieberson) (1983) by Peter Lieberson
Piano Concerto No. 1 (Lindberg) (1994) by Magnus Lindberg
Piano Concerto No. 1 (Liszt) (S. 124), by Franz Liszt
Piano Concerto No. 1 (Mendelssohn) (Op. 25), by Felix Mendelssohn
Piano Concerto No. 1 (Mozart) (KV 37), by Wolfgang Mozart
Piano Concerto No. 1 (Prokofiev) (Op. 10), by Sergei Prokofiev
Piano Concerto No. 1 (Rachmaninoff) (Op. 1), by Sergei Rachmaninoff
Piano Concerto No. 1 (Rubinstein) (Op. 25, 1858) by Anton Rubinstein
Piano Concerto No. 1 (Saint-Saëns) (Op. 17), by Camille Saint-Saëns
Piano Concerto No. 1 (Shostakovich) (Op. 35), by Dmitri Shostakovich
Piano Concerto No. 1 (Tchaikovsky) (Op. 23), by Pyotr Tchaikovsky
Piano Concerto No. 1 (Villa-Lobos) (1945), by Heitor Villa-Lobos

It may also refer to the only concerto, or first of an alternately named piece:
Piano Concerto (Barber) (Op. 38), by Samuel Barber
Piano Concerto (Busoni) (Op. 39), by Ferrucio Busoni
Piano Concerto (Cowell) (1928), by Henry Cowell
Piano Concerto (Dvořák) (Op. 33), by Antonín Dvořák
Piano Concerto (Furtwängler) (1937), by Wilhelm Furtwängler
Concerto in F (Gershwin) (1925), by George Gershwin
Piano Concerto (Grieg) (Op. 16), by Edvard Grieg
Piano Concerto (Khachaturian) (1936), by Aram Khachaturian
Piano Concerto (Ligeti) (1988), by György Ligeti
Piano Concerto in G (Ravel) (1931), by Maurice Ravel
Concierto heroico (1943), by Joaquín Rodrigo
Piano Concerto (Schoenberg) (Op. 42), by Arnold Schoenberg
Piano Concerto (Schumann) (Op. 54), by Robert Schumann
Piano Concerto (Scriabin) (Op. 20), by Alexander Scriabin

See also
List of compositions for piano and orchestra